Housego is a surname. Notable people with the surname include:

Dan Housego (born 1988), English cricketer
Fred Housego (born 1944), British game show contestant